India participated in the 1954 Asian Games held in the city of Manila, Philippines from 1 May 1954 to 9 May 1954. India ranked 5th with 4 gold medals in this edition of the Asiad.

Medal table

See also
G. Muthuraj

References

Nations at the 1954 Asian Games
1954
Asian Games